Serap Aktaş (born September 25, 1971 in Ceyhan, Turkey) is a Turkish female middle and long-distance runner, who later specialized in marathon. She holds various Turkish records.

In 1994, she finished the Istanbul Marathon first in the women's category, an achievement not reached yet by any other Turkish female athlete. She won the gold medal in women's marathon at the 1997 Mediterranean Games held in Bari, Italy. Serap Aktaş represented Turkey at the 1996 Summer Olympics in Atlanta, United States and 2000 Summer Olympics in Sydney, Australia in marathon finishing 23rd and 37th respectively.

Achievements
All results regarding marathon, unless stated otherwise

Personal bests 
1500 m 4:20.90 (1994) NR
 1 mile 4:49.43  (1994) NR
3000 m 9:07.04 (1994) NR
5000 m 15:53.76 (1995) NR
10000 m 32:59.76 (1994) NR
Half marathon 1:13:17 (1997) NR
Marathon 2:31:43 (1999) NR
NR - National record

References

External links
IAAF profile for Serap Aktaş

1971 births
Living people
People from Ceyhan
Olympic athletes of Turkey
Athletes (track and field) at the 1996 Summer Olympics
Athletes (track and field) at the 2000 Summer Olympics
Turkish female middle-distance runners
Turkish female long-distance runners
Turkish female marathon runners
Mediterranean Games gold medalists for Turkey
Mediterranean Games silver medalists for Turkey
Athletes (track and field) at the 1997 Mediterranean Games
Athletes (track and field) at the 2001 Mediterranean Games
Mediterranean Games medalists in athletics
20th-century Turkish sportswomen